Cybulski (feminine: Cybulska, plural: Cybulscy) is a Polish surname derived from the name of the village Cybulin.

People 
 Grzegorz Cybulski (born 1951), Polish long jump champion
 Henryk Cybulski (1910-1971), Polish resistance fighter
 James Cybulski, Canadian sportscaster
 Mieczysław Cybulski (1903-1984), Polish actor
 Napoleon Cybulski (1854-1919), Polish physiologist
 Patrick Cybulski (k?d) (born 1997), American electronic musician and DJ
 Piotr Cybulski (born 1955), Polish politician
 Zbigniew Cybulski (1927-1967), Polish actor

Fictional characters:
Ewa Cybulska, a fictional Polish character played by Marion Cotillard in the 2013 American film The Immigrant

See also 
 Cebulki, a village in Warmian-Masurian, Poland
 C. B. Cebulski, an American comic writer and editor
 Alexander Weissberg-Cybulski, Polish-Austrian physicist

Polish-language surnames
Polish toponymic surnames